Frederick Wheeler (1853–1931) (FRIBA) was a British architect, born in Brixton, Surrey, in October 1853. His parents were Christopher and Mary Ann Wheeler. He was articled to Charles Henry Driver (1832–1900), whose offices were at 7 Parliament Street, London SW1, and who is best known as the architect for the Victoria Embankment and Abbey Mills.

Wheeler began his career as an architect working on a number of commissions in south London. In 1880 Sussex House, on the corner of Tooting Bec Gardens and Ambleside Avenue, was constructed as the Sussex House School (now residential). He designed a number of terraces around Mitcham Lane and Streatham station in what Pevsner calls a 'competent Queen Anne style'. At that time he favoured the use of dark red brick often carved into swags and floral designs. He was the architect for the 1880 Sussex House, on Garrads Rd, Wandsworth

In 1891 Wheeler lived with his wife Elizabeth (born in Dublin) at 21 Carfax, Horsham, and in 1897 he designed the Westminster bank in the town's main square – one of his many commissions for this bank.

Major works

Wheeler's best known work is St Paul's Studios on Talgarth Road, London, W14 in 1890 which have much in common with the hundreds of other domestic studios constructed towards the end of the 19th century.  St Paul's studios were built by Wheeler for James Fairless, a fineart publisher, to house bachelor artists. Wheeler had previously built a similar house on the same street, at number 151, for Sir Coutts Lindsay, founder of the Grosvenor Gallery, which was the main showroom for artists of the aesthetic movement such as Whistler. Sir Edward Burne-Jones painted his last canvas there, and his son, also a painter, lived there for many years.

The spaces for art and life at St Paul's Studios comprised three rooms on the ground floor, a studio 30 feet long and 22 ft wide with a  ceiling on the top floor, and a basement flat (which was originally for the housekeeper).

In 2003, one of these studios was on the market at £1,100,000 – one thousand times the cost of its original construction. In 2007, another was on the market for £1,200,000.

£220,000 in 1993 article on artists' studios in London

In 1895 his office was at 22 Chancery Lane, London but he had also been present in Horsham since 1891 at the latest.  Most of his work is in London, although he also designed banks, a community centre and library at Cowfold in Sussex and St James's church at Littlehampton.  In 1899 (KD) his partner was Percy Dean Lodge (who may have worked at Horsham only).  From 1903, when this partnership was dissolved, until 1907 he was alone and then from 1907 to 1921 C R B Godman joined him and also his son, C W F Wheeler.  Father and son remained partners after 1921 in London only.
Lit: BAL Biog file

In 1896 he designed an electricity transformer sub-station adjacent to the Roman Catholic church at the junction of Tooting Bec Gardens and Streatham High Road in Lambeth. It was built in coarse rubble with ashlar dressings in what is called a '15th century Gothic style' with large traceried windows. The building is listed but in 2012 appears to be in a poor state of repair.

Also on Streatham High Road, Wheeler designed a number of grand shopping parades in the 1880s and 90s, one of the finest being The Triangle (Nos. 324-342) which has a dramatic roofline of Dutch gables, a curved fish-scale tiled roof to No. 324 and elevations of red brick with horizontal stone banding.

In 1897 Wheeler was commissioned by Sir Henry Harben, President of the Prudential Assurance Co., to design a convalescence home on the sea front at Rustington, Sussex. Pevsner describes this as '...dashing free-Wren design done with enough panache to give it a life of its own – a very good seaside building'. This is listed grade II.

As well as St Paul's Studios, one of Wheeler's finest buildings is the Mount Vernon Hospital, Northwood, Middlesex (still intact) (1902–04) and an associated chapel which incorporates Art Nouveau designs and motifs. This was commissioned by the London County Council as a replacement for the London Hospital for Consumption and Diseases of the Chest formerly at 7 Fitzroy Square, London W1. The chapel is listed grade II*.

Later works

Whilst living for many years in Horsham, Wheeler also lived in Sutton at least from 1911 in Cambourne Road and in 1922 designed a new house for his family at Cotlands, 86 Mulgrave Road, Sutton, in a style which for the first time included influences of the Modern Movement. He died here in 1931. He clearly knew Sutton well because he also designed Russettings, a house for George Smith, in 1899, at 25 Worcester Road, Sutton, which is now the London Borough of Sutton's Register Office. He was also responsible for a Westminster Bank in Sutton Court Road in 1902 and the Sutton Adult School, Benhill Avenue, Sutton, commissioned in 1909 by Thomas Wall, a local benefactor and CEO of the family's company: ice cream and sausage manufacturer.

Other buildings by Wheeler's practice

Altered/extended: Holy Innocents Church, Southwater, West Sussex, was built in 1848 to a design by James Park Harrison (1817–1902) of London. In 1909 work commenced on the construction of a new vestry to the south of the chancel in accordance with plans prepared by local architects, Wheeler & Godman. The work cost £280, of which £200 was donated by the Fletcher family, and was completed in 1910.

Horsham
The Carfax 1898

Rustington
convalescent home 1897

Partners

Charles Richard Bayly Godman (1879–1946) was from 1907 the partner of Wheeler and his son, William Trevor Wheeler, in Horsham (KD). By 1921 both Wheelers were in London and the partnership was dissolved.  From then until his death Godman’s partner was Claude John Kay (b.1878), Wheeler’s former assistant.  They built many banks and houses.  His grandson Stephen Attwood Trevor Wheeler was also an established architect, responsible for many shopping arcades, cinemas, banks and some grand and multiple occupancy houses in Surrey.

References

External links 
Remember the Window, a blog dedicated to the St. Paul's Studios
http://www.shadyoldlady.com/location.php?loc=1043

1853 births
1931 deaths
Architects from Surrey
Fellows of the Royal Institute of British Architects